The Lawless Nineties is a 1936 American Western film directed by Joseph Kane and starring John Wayne and Lane Chandler as federal agents in Wyoming. The film also stars a 19-year-old Ann Rutherford as well as George Hayes.

The film's copyright was renewed in 1963.

Plot
In the 1890s, undercover federal agents John Tipton and Bridger head for Crocket City, Wyoming. One group of local outlaws organized by Charles Plummer is using dynamite to terrorize the populace and ensure that the vote fails. In the chaos, Tipton and Bridger are separated and Tipton befriends a trio of settlers harassed by outlaws. They are Major Carter, his daughter Janet, and their servant Moses.

Carter has recently become the new editor and publisher of the local newspaper, the Crocket City Blade, and when he announces plans to use the power of the press to fight lawlessness and aid the statehood cause, he is threatened by Plummer and subsequently shot and murdered by one of his men in a staged fight.

When Plummer's henchmen eventually kill Bridger, after learning of his status as a government agent, Tipton fights on. On the day of the election, the villains actually initially stop the homesteaders from voting but Tipton leads in a bunch of agents and ranchers to crush the outlaws. It results in all the baddies brought to justice, Wyoming becoming a state and Tipton getting the pretty girl, Janet.

Cast
John Wayne as John Tipton
Ann Rutherford as Janet Carter
Harry Woods as Charles K. Plummer
George Hayes as Maj. Carter
Al Bridge as Steele 
Fred Toones as Moses (billed as "Snowflake")
Etta McDaniel as  Mandy Lou Schaefer 
Tom Brower as Marshal Bowen 
Lane Chandler as  Bridger
Cliff Lyons as Davis 
Jack Rockwell as  Smith 
Al Taylor as Henchman Red
Charles King as  Henchman Hartley 
George Chesebro as Henchman Green 
Tracy Lane as Belden

See also
 John Wayne filmography

References

External links
 

1936 films
Films set in the 1890s
American black-and-white films
Films directed by Joseph Kane
1936 Western (genre) films
Republic Pictures films
Films set in Wyoming
Films shot in California
American Western (genre) films
Films with screenplays by Joseph F. Poland
1930s English-language films
1930s American films